Fort Street Presbyterian Church is a historic Presbyterian church building at 516 W. Hopkins Street in San Marcos, Texas.

The late-Gothic Revival building was constructed in 1901 and added to the National Register of Historic Places in 1984.

See also

National Register of Historic Places listings in Hays County, Texas
Recorded Texas Historic Landmarks in Hays County

References

Presbyterian churches in Texas
Churches on the National Register of Historic Places in Texas
Gothic Revival church buildings in Texas
Churches completed in 1901
20th-century Presbyterian church buildings in the United States
Churches in Hays County, Texas
Buildings and structures in San Marcos, Texas
National Register of Historic Places in Hays County, Texas
Recorded Texas Historic Landmarks